The Fishing News is a national weekly newspaper published in London. The paper serves the professional fishing industry.

History
Founded in 1913 in Aberdeen, in 1961 the publishers of Fishing News also began to publish Fishing News International, a quarterly magazine. There was also by then a sister company, Fishing News (Books) Limited, publishing works of reference.

In 1973 Fishing News was published by A. J. H. Publications Ltd. at 110 Fleet Street, London EC4, and was reported to deal with all aspects of the commercial fishing industry, including catching, processing, distribution, and research.

Present day
The paper is now on sale in all parts of the British Isles and covers all relevant news about the British and Irish commercial fishing industries, together with features.

The paper is printed by Mortons of Horncastle, and in 2016 its work on Fishing News was awarded the title Niche Market Newspaper of the Year at the News Awards ceremony in London.

Fishing News runs an annual Fishing Vessel of the Year competition. The 2022 awards took place in Aberdeen.

References

External links 
 Official website
Fishing News back issues, pocketmags.com

Newspapers published in London
Newspapers established in 1913
Newspapers published in Scotland
Fishing industry